Maurice Alexander Jr. (born January 10, 1997) is an American football wide receiver for the Detroit Lions of the National Football League (NFL). He was selected with the 8th pick in the 17th round (No. 139 overall) of the 2022 USFL Draft. He played college football at the Florida International University. After college, he went unsigned as an undrafted free agent in the 2020 NFL Draft.

High school career

As a junior, Alexander threw for 2,111 yards and 26 touchdowns on his way to earning Second-team All-Miami Dade County selection, as well as being named 2014 Team MVP for Booker T. Washington Tornadoes.

As a senior, he guided the Tornadoes to a perfect 15-0 season, throwing for 3,060 yards and 32 touchdowns, rushing for 466 yards seven wouchdowns. This culminated with a state championship, and 34-28 victory in the 2015 Burger King State Champions Bowl Series against Bingham Miners, with Alexander rushing for the winning touchdown. He was named 2015 Dade County Player of the Year, First-team All-Date County, Class 4A First-team All-State and Booker T. Washington Offensive MVP.

College career

Alexander was recruited to Florida International as a dual threat player. After redshirting the 2015 season, Alexander went on to appear in eight games (starting four) as a redshirt freshman. He was primarily a backup to quarterback Alex McGough with his gametime coming in relief of McGough. He finished the 2016 season with 613 passing yards and two touchdowns, 109 rushing yards and one rushing touchdown.

In the 2017 season Alexander played in eight games for the Panthers. He filled in, in the 2017 Gasparilla Bowl when McGough went down with a fractured collarbone. FIU went on to lose the game 28-3 with Alexander completing 16-of-33 passes for 162 yards being intercepted twice.

At the beginning of his redshirt junior year, Alexander made the switch from quarterback to wide receiver. He featured in 13 games (starting nine) finishing first on the team in receptions (40), second in receiving touchdowns (5) and third in receiving yards (474). Against UMass, Alexander became the first FIU Panther in school history to score a receiving and punt return touchdown in the same game. He ended the season being named to the 2018 C-USA All-Conference First-team as a punt returner.

Alexander's 2019 season ended prematurely after 9 games, suffering a season ending injury against Old Dominion. He once again had a game to remember against UMass, racking up 140 yards in punt returns including a 90-yard touchdown return, the longest of the season in the FBS. His best performance came at Middle Tennessee catching five passes for 87 yards, scoring his only receiving touchdown of the year.

Statistics

Professional career

Philadelphia Stars

Alexander was selected by Philadelphia Stars on 23 February 2022, Day 2 of 2022 USFL Draft. Wide receivers became eligible for selection between rounds 13-17 and again in the supplemental draft. Alexander was the penultimate wide receiver selected in the draft proper, picked in round 17, 139th overall.

Alexander was named in the Week 2 All-USFL Team. He finished the game against Pittsburgh Maulers with 186 all-purpose yards, 87 receiving yards from 8 receptions and 2 receiving touchdowns. Despite this, he has been used predominantly as a return specialist, leading the team in both kick and punt return yards.

Detroit Lions
Alexander signed with the Detroit Lions on August 3, 2022. He was waived on August 30, 2022 and signed to the practice squad the next day. He was promoted to the active roster on October 8, 2022. He was waived two days later. He was re-signed to the practice squad two days later. He was promoted back to the active roster on October 22. He was waived on October 24, 2022. He was re-signed to the practice squad two days later. He signed a reserve/future contract on January 9, 2023.

Statistics

Post season

Personal life
Alexander is the son of Maurice Alexander Sr. and Kevia Morrison. He has one sibling Maurkevia.

Alexander's has three cousins who played American football to a collegiate level. Shaun and Nate Terry played at West Virginia while James Terry played at Kansas State.

Notes

References

External links
FIU Panthers bio
Fox Sports player bio
Twitter

Living people
1997 births
Detroit Lions players
Philadelphia Stars (2022) players
Players of American football from Florida
FIU Panthers football players